Don't Look Away may refer to:

 Don't Look Away (Kate Voegele album), 2007
 Don't Look Away (Alexander Tucker album), 2018
 "Don't Look Away" (The Who song)
 "Don't Look Away" (Hurricane No. 1 song)